India competed at the 2010 South Asian Games held in Dhaka, Bangladesh from 29 January to 8 February 2010. India ranked 1st with 90 gold medals in this edition of the South Asian Games.

2010 South Asian Games
2010 South Asian Games
South